Mogui may refer to:

 Mogwai, the Cantonese Chinese term for devil, ghost or evil spirit.
 Yuwen Mogui, the ancient Chinese chieftain of the Yuwen tribe.